Aq Qabaq-e Sofla (also Romanized as Āq Qabāq-e Soflá; also known as Āq Qabāq) is a village in Aslan Duz-e Sharqi Rural District of the Central District of Aslan Duz County, Ardabil province, Iran. Before Aslan Duz District separated from Parsabad County to become the county of Aslan Duz, the village was in Aslan Duz Rural District. At the 2006 census, its population was 972 in 159 households. The following census in 2011 counted 866 people in 216 households. The latest census in 2016 showed a population of 978 people in 284 households; it was the largest village in its rural district.

References 

Aslan Duz County

Populated places in Ardabil Province